The 1986 NCAA Division III football season, part of the college football season organized by the NCAA at the Division III level in the United States, began in August 1986, and concluded with the NCAA Division III Football Championship, also known as the Stagg Bowl, in December 1986 at Garrett-Harrison Stadium in Phenix City, Alabama. The Augustana (IL) Vikings won the fourth of their four consecutive Division III championships by defeating the Salisbury State Sea Gulls by a final score of 31−3.

Conference standings

Conference champions

Postseason
The 1986 NCAA Division III Football Championship playoffs were the 14th annual single-elimination tournament to determine the national champion of men's NCAA Division III college football. The championship Stagg Bowl game was held at Garrett-Harrison Stadium in Phenix City, Alabama for the twelfth time and for the second consecutive year. Like the previous tournament, this year's bracket featured sixteen teams.

Playoff bracket

See also
1986 NCAA Division I-A football season
1986 NCAA Division I-AA football season
1986 NCAA Division II football season

References